Delny is a small hamlet in the parish of Kilmuir-Easter in Ross-shire, Scotland. It was the site of a castle, that was once the seat of the Earl of Ross.

References

Populated places in Ross and Cromarty